François "Prosper" Colas (1842–1919) was a French archetier / bow maker based in Mirecourt, France.

Born in Goincourt (Meurthe et Moselle)	in 1842, he apprenticed locally, and was influenced by the late Dominique Peccatte school (in his early period).
Prosper Colas's work is similar to that of François Bazin, Charles Claude Husson, and Pierre Cuniot.
Around 1871, he came to Paris where he likely met  Jean-Baptiste Vuillaume and worked for him. The first bows bearing his brand can be dated to this period and reflect Vuillaume's influence (with the "Vuillaume style frogs").
Prosper Colas worked for a varied number of makers and produced a huge quantity of bows. His best production was from the turn of the century (early 20th century).
His lower tier production is stamped “P.C.”.
One can also find instruments bearing Prosper Colas's label as he sold mail order instruments made by the primary Mirecourt workshops of his time: Jérôme Thibouville-Lamy and Marc Laberte.

"Prosper Colas died in 1919, at which point his  business was taken over by Ferret-Marcotte".

References 

 
 
 
 Dictionnaire Universel del Luthiers - Rene Vannes 1951,1972, 1985 (vol.3)

1842 births
1919 deaths
Bow makers
19th-century French people
Luthiers from Mirecourt